The 2013 Tour du Haut Var was the 45th edition of the Tour du Haut Var cycle race and was held on 16–17 February 2013. The race started in Le Cannet-des-Maures and finished in Draguignan. The race was won by Arthur Vichot.

General classification

References

2013
2013 in road cycling
2013 in French sport